Iron Lad (Nathaniel "Nate" Richards) is a fictional superhero character appearing in American comic books published by Marvel Comics. He is an adolescent version of Kang the Conqueror, armed with a bio-metal suit that responds to mental commands. He is named after his ancestor of the same name.

Publication history
Iron Lad first appeared in Young Avengers #1 (April 2005), created by writer Allan Heinberg and artist Jim Cheung.

Fictional character biography
Sixteen-year-old Nathaniel "Nate" Richards is rescued by his time-traveling adult self, the villainous Kang the Conqueror, moments before bullies would cause him to be hospitalized for years of his life from a knife attack, an event that originally shaped his development into a villain. Kang takes his teenage self through time to witness the future battles and glory that would result in his transformation into Kang the Conqueror, hoping to inspire his younger self. However, it backfires and Nate is horrified at the life of evil his future self shows him. Kang presses Nate to accept his future by killing the bully who would have hospitalized him. Instead, Nate takes the time travel technology given to him by Kang and transports himself to the past, hoping to avoid his sinister destiny.

He seeks the Avengers for assistance, but finds the Avengers disbanded. Seeking answers, he downloads the remnants of the destroyed Vision's operating system into his armor. This reveals a fail-safe plan created by the android to reform the Avengers should they disband or fall in action by locating the next generation of Avengers, all of whom have some tie to the original team. Using this plan, Nate assembles his new team, the Young Avengers, with the sole purpose of defeating his future self and reshaping his own future. He models his armor after the Avenger Iron Man, calling himself Iron Lad, and forming a romantic relationship with fellow Young Avenger teammate Cassie "Stature" Lang.

Eventually, Kang comes to the past looking for Nate, wanting to return his younger self to his proper place in the timestream. Nate refuses to return, unwilling to become the infamous future villain. The team battle the Growing Man, a robot created by Kang, and are able to defeat him. Kang battles the remaining Avengers and the teen heroes, seemingly gaining the upper hand until Iron Lad runs Hawkeye's sword through Kang's chest. This kills Kang, but the ramifications cause several changes to the timeline, including all the Avengers being dead and Young Avengers Wiccan and Hulkling disappearing as well as Jessica Jones losing her baby. Iron Lad realizes that the only way to restore everything is to go back to his time and assume his role as Kang the Conqueror. In doing so he will also lose his memories of his time in the past as a Young Avenger. Before he goes back in time, he asks his teammates to forgive him for the actions he will commit in the future and kisses Cassie goodbye. He leaves behind his armor, which has activated the Vision's operating software, effectively recreating the armor into a sentient being—an inexperienced "young" Vision, Jonas. Jonas carries Nate's brain patterns and memories, similar to the original Vision and Wonder Man.

Cassie and Jonas eventually feel attracted to one another, due initially to Nate's mental imprint. They later begin a relationship. While fighting the cosmic cube-altered Absorbing Man, during the "Dark Reign" storyline, Jonas (now a joint member of the Young Avengers and the Mighty Avengers) is affected by the cube's cosmic radiation and splits into both Iron Lad (Nate) and the original Vision. Iron Lad appears to maintain the memories of the events prior to going back in time. After the Absorbing Man is defeated, the original Vision and Iron Lad merge back together as the new Vision once again.

Iron Lad appears in the 2010-12 miniseries, Avengers: The Children's Crusade, in which he prevents Wolverine from killing an amnesiac and de-powered Wanda Maximoff (whom Wolverine feels presents too great a threat). Iron Lad states that he does this because the future depends on their survival. Soon thereafter, Cassie's deceased father Scott Lang is plucked from the past and saved, but Cassie is killed. Iron Lad insists upon travelling back to the past to save her, and he kills Jonas when he protests. When the Young Avengers tell Iron Lad that this is most likely the event that will lead him down the path to becoming Kang the Conqueror, he states that "I will be better than Kang the Conqueror", and disappears into the timestream.

Nate, now going by the name Kid Immortus, later provides information to Doctor Doom regarding the Future Foundation. He is also seen in the company of a young Ravonna.

After Doom's plan fails, Iron Lad returns and rescues Captain America from the timestream. He and two of his future counterparts, Kang the Conqueror and Immortus, attempt to hold Captain America prisoner so that he cannot interfere with the Illuminati's plan to save Earth by destroying numerous alternate worlds during the "Time Runs Out" storyline, but Captain America manages to escape.

Richards returns once again as Iron Lad in the Exiles series alongside original member Blink and new members including Wolvie, Sharon Carter and Valkyrie, fighting a multiversal conglomerate of Kangs known as the "Time-Eater", later sacrificing himself to save the rest of the Exiles from a group of rogue Watchers.

Powers and abilities
Nate's Iron Lad armor is composed of neuro-kinetic nano-metal and he can alter its appearance and shape with his thoughts. The armor grants Iron Lad superhuman strength and allows him to fly. It also enables him to fire blasts of various kinds of energy, hack into computer systems, create magnetic fields and travel through time. Kang's psychic link with his armor also enables him to mentally control the Iron Lad armor from a close range.

Other versions
In What If the Runaways had formed the Young Avengers?, with Iron Lad having never learned about the Vision's Avengers' Fail-Safe Initiative, he instead recruits the Runaways as his allies, forcing them to be an actual superhero team with costumes. Although it is later revealed that the Iron Lad that brought them together was actually Victor Mancha— Iron Lad ran into Victor's future self when attempting to flee to the Avengers' era, with Victorious travelling back with him and using Victor to hijack his equipment—Kang's attempt to rescue his younger self results in Iron Lad being killed and Kang being erased from history. After Victor destroys his future self, he departs via Kang's time-belt to find his own way, leaving the Runaways to continue as Young Avengers, with Chase Stein now using parts of the Iron Lad armor after he was injured in their last fight.
In Exiles vol. 3, an alternate version of Nate who embraced his role as Kang, dubbed the Iron Prince, appears as a member of the Dark Exiles.

In other media
Iron Lad appears as an unlockable character in the mobile game Marvel Avengers Academy, voiced by Billy Kametz. He appears as part of the "Armor Wars" mini-event.

References

Iron Lad - In Depth Overview 

Iron Lad - Variant of Kang The Conqueror at marveldccinezone.co.in

External links
 Iron Lad at Marvel.com
 
 Iron Lad at Comic Vine

Avengers (comics) characters
Comics about time travel
Marvel Comics superheroes
Marvel Comics male superheroes
Comics characters introduced in 2005
Time travelers
Characters created by Allan Heinberg
Marvel Comics characters with superhuman strength
Marvel Comics characters who are shapeshifters
Marvel Comics child superheroes
Teenage superheroes